The Northeast Document Conservation Center (NEDCC) was founded in 1973 and is the first non-profit conservation center in the United States to specialize in the preservation of paper-based library and archival materials. 

The Center was initiated by the state librarians of the six New England states, who agreed to cooperate across state lines to provide a service to non-profit institutions in the region. 

The Center was established with start-up funds from the Council on Library Resources, the New England Library Board, and other donors. For seven years the Center functioned as an arm of the New England Library Board. In 1980, it incorporated as a private, non-profit organization, providing services to clients nationally.

NEDCC performs book conservation, paper conservation, photograph conservation, Asian paintings conservation, collections surveys, digitization, and audio preservation with the IRENE technology, on a fee-for-service basis. Through its Preservation Services office, NEDCC also provides preservation needs assessments, training programs including workshops and webinars, consultations, resources, and disaster assistance. NEDCC presents a yearly national conference, "Digital Directions", on creating sustainable digital collections.

Clients include the National Archives, Boston Public Library, the Baseball Hall of Fame, and Harvard University. In addition to helping repositories, NEDCC assists performing arts institutions, religious organizations, hospitals, social service agencies, labor unions, zoos, and botanical gardens as well as private and family collectors.

Examples of projects undertaken at the Center include the conservation treatment of historic artifacts such as Lewis and Clark's elk skin journal, the Emancipation Proclamation, and Babe Ruth's personal scrapbook.

See also
 Preservation (library and archival science)

References

External links
 Northeast Document Conservation Center

Library-related organizations
Non-profit organizations based in Massachusetts